Nathaniel Merriweather Presents... Lovage: Music to Make Love to Your Old Lady By is the debut studio album by Lovage. It was released by 75 Ark in 2001. It peaked at number 37 on the Billboard Independent Albums chart.

Artwork
The album's artwork is a homage to the cover of Serge Gainsbourg's second album.

Critical reception

At Metacritic, which assigns a weighted average score out of 100 to reviews from mainstream critics, the album received an average score of 66 based on 12 reviews, indicating "generally favorable reviews".

M. F. DiBella of AllMusic gave the album 2.5 stars out of 5, saying: "[While Dan the Automator is] quite possibly one of the most accomplished beat processors in the realm of art hip-hop/electronica, his strict-composer approach on this project is occasionally inaccessible and at times unlistenable." Kevin Adickes of Pitchfork gave the album a 4.5 out of 10, saying: "My biggest gripe about Lovage is that it finds a number of clearly talented artists constructing the same song continually without variation." Kylee Swenson of Blender gave the album 3 stars out of 5, saying: "Lovage is music to put ladies in the mood, and it works both as satire and actual make-out fare."

Track listing

Personnel
Credits adapted from liner notes.

 Dan the Automator – production, mixing
 Mike Patton – vocals
 Jennifer Charles – vocals
 Astacio the Nudist – guitar
 SweetP – harpsichord, nose flute
 Kid Koala – turntables
 Daniel Spills – keyboards (3, 5, 9, 16)
 Chest Rockwell – vocals (1)
 Afrika Bambaataa – vocals (7)
 Sir Damien Thorne VII of the Cockfoster's Clan – vocals (11)
 Chármelle Carmel – vocals (14)
 Howie Weinberg – mastering
 James Dawson – photography
 Brandon Arnovick – layout

Charts

References

External links
 
 

2001 debut albums
Lovage (band) albums
Albums produced by Dan the Automator
75 Ark albums